Admiral Sir Guy Charles Cecil Royle  (17 August 1885 – 4 January 1954) was a Royal Navy officer who went on to be Fifth Sea Lord and First Naval Member of the Royal Australian Navy.

Naval career
Royle joined the Royal Navy with a commission as a midshipman in 1900.

He served in the First World War as Gunnery Officer on the battleship  and was at the Battle of Jutland in 1916, then on the staff of Admiral Sir Charles Madden in the Grand Fleet. By 1919 he had been promoted commander and in July 1919 was appointed a Companion of the Order of St Michael and St George "for valuable services as Gunnery officer of H. M. S. "Marlborough", 1st Battle Squadron, and as Flag Commander to the Admiral, Second in Command, Grand Fleet."

Royle was appointed Assistant to the Deputy Director of Naval Ordnance in 1923 and became Naval attaché in Tokyo in 1924. He was given command of the cruiser  in 1927, the shore establishment  in 1930 and the aircraft carrier  in 1933. He went on to be Naval Secretary from 1934 and to 1937, when he was appointed Vice Admiral commanding the aircraft carriers, serving until 1939. In the Second World War, he returned briefly as Naval Secretary from September to November, 1939, then until 1941 was Fifth Sea Lord and Chief of the Naval Air Service, when he became First Naval Member of the Australian Commonwealth Naval Board; he retired the service in 1946.

Royle was knighted in 1941 and promoted admiral in 1942.

In retirement he was appointed briefly as Secretary to the Lord Great Chamberlain and finally as Yeoman Usher (deputy) of the Black Rod, a ceremonial position in the House of Lords, serving in that office from 1946 to 1953. He collapsed and died while putting out a heath fire near his home at Wimborne Minster in Dorset.

References 

1885 births
1954 deaths
Companions of the Order of St Michael and St George
Foreign recipients of the Legion of Merit
Knights Commander of the Order of the Bath
Lords of the Admiralty
People educated at Stubbington House School
Royal Navy admirals of World War II
Royal Navy personnel of World War I
Admiralty personnel of World War II
Military personnel from Surrey